Pleurotomella rothauseni is an extinct species of sea snail, a marine gastropod mollusk in the family Raphitomidae.

Description

Distribution
Fossils of this marine species were found in Oligocene strata in Aquitaine, France.

References

 Lozouet P. (2015). Nouvelles espèces de gastéropodes (Mollusca: Gastropoda) de l'Oligocène et du Miocène inférieur d'Aquitaine (Sud-Ouest de la France). Partie 5. Cossmanniana. 17: 15–84.

rothauseni
Gastropods described in 1998